National Philharmonic may refer to:

 National Philharmonic Orchestra
 National Philharmonic at Strathmore
 National Philharmonic in Warsaw
 Warsaw National Philharmonic Orchestra
 National Philharmonic of Ukraine
 National Philharmonic of Russia